The British Embassy Pyongyang is the British sovereign's diplomatic mission to the Democratic People's Republic of Korea, representing the United Kingdom's interests. It is located in the Munsu-dong diplomatic compound (in the Taedonggang District), where most of the diplomatic missions to North Korea are located, with the exception of the Russian and Chinese missions.

It shares a building with the German, French and Swedish missions to North Korea, in what was originally the East German mission and was transferred to the government of the present Germany upon German reunification. The former East German embassy was established at a time when North Korea relied almost exclusively on the Comecon Countries, along with China, for external trade.

History

The UK and North Korea had no formal diplomatic relations until 12 December 2000, when diplomatic missions in London and Pyongyang were established. James Hoare was chargé d'affaires from 2001–02 until a permanent ambassador was appointed by the UK Government: the first full-time accredited British diplomat was James Warren. The embassy itself opened in July 2001 and the first ambassador, David Slinn, arrived in North Korea in November 2002.

Incidents
On 5 April 2013 the North Korean government advised the British Embassy, and all other missions, that the safety of their missions could not be assured past 10 April 2013. This was part of the North Korean government's response to United Nations Security Council Resolution 2094 and deterioration of relations between North Korea and the United States.

In May 2020 the embassy was closed due to the COVID-19 pandemic. Some other countries had their diplomats evacuated earlier in March.

See also
 List of ambassadors of the United Kingdom to North Korea
 List of diplomatic missions in North Korea
 Foreign relations of North Korea

References

External links
 British Embassy Pyongyang – gov.uk

North Korea–United Kingdom relations
United Kingdom
Pyongyang